Benjamin Stewart Parsons (July 12, 1941 – January 16, 2007) was an American NASCAR driver, and later an announcer/analyst/pit reporter on SETN, TBS, ABC, ESPN, NBC, and TNT. He became famous as the 1973 NASCAR Winston Cup Series champion, and was a 2017 NASCAR Hall of Fame inductee. He was the older brother of former NASCAR driver, car owner, and broadcaster Phil Parsons of Phil Parsons Racing.

He was nicknamed "BP" and The Professor, the latter in part because of his popular remarks and relaxed demeanor.

Early life
Parsons was born in Wilkes County, North Carolina. He spent his childhood years in the Blue Ridge Mountains of North Carolina and played football at Millers Creek High School (now known as West Wilkes High School). Following high school, he moved to Detroit, Michigan where his father operated a taxicab company. Parsons worked at a gas station and drove cabs in Detroit before beginning his racing career. While working at the gas station one day, a couple of customers towing a race car invited him to a local race track. The driver of the car never showed up for that evening's race, and Parsons drove the car in a race for the first time later that night. Benny later moved to Ellerbe, North Carolina and always called it home.

Driving career

1960s
Parsons began his NASCAR career by running a single race in 1964 for Holman-Moody with a young Cale Yarborough.

Parsons won the 1968 and 1969 ARCA championships, and then moved to Ellerbe, North Carolina.

Parsons had three top-10 finishes in four NASCAR races in 1969.

1970s
Benny joined the NASCAR circuit full-time in 1970 with crew chief, John Hill. He had 23 top-10 finishes in 45 races, a pole at Langley Field Speedway, and finished eighth in the final point standings. He raced the No. 72 car for L.G. DeWitt/DeWitt Racing.

Parsons had 18 top-10 finishes in 35 starts in 1971, including his first win at South Boston Speedway. He finished eleventh in the points.

In 1972 he had 19 top-10 finishes in 31 races. He finished fifth in the final points standings.

In 1973 he won the NASCAR Winston Cup Series Championship with only one win, even though David Pearson won eleven races (but Pearson only entered eighteen events). Parsons' consistency likely won him the championship: he had 21 top-10 and 15 top-5 finishes in the 28 events. His improbable return to the track after an early crash cemented his championship at Rockingham, North Carolina. He saw his championship hopes start to fade as he was involved in a lap 13 crash and his car was heavily damaged. He took to the pits to muster whatever he could out of the car and hope for a top five finish in the final standings. The rest of the garage was hoping to see the underdog unseat the mighty Richard Petty and joined in to help Parsons' crew put the car back together. Parsons miraculously got back on the track 136 laps later and completed enough laps to finish 25th and take the 1973 championship. Richard Petty, with the championship in his sights after winning the pole and seeing Parsons' accident, had engine trouble and was relegated to a 35th-place finish. The poor performance dropped Petty all the way to fifth in the final standings, as Cale Yarborough took the runner up spot on the season with his third-place effort. He finished 67 points behind the champion.

Parsons also became the only person to win both ARCA and NASCAR championships.

Parsons finished between third and fifth in the final points standings from 1974 to 1980 and won the 1975 Daytona 500. He switched to the No. 27 entry for M.C. Anderson starting in 1979.

In 1979 at North Wilkesboro Speedway, Bobby Allison led most of the race but in the final 150 laps, Darrell Waltrip caught Allison. The two hit together hard and Darrell nailed the front stretch wall. Waltrip began crowding off Allison under the caution and got black flagged for the crowding. Benny Parsons would win the race,  but it would be his only win at the North Wilkesboro Speedway, a track which his wife Terri (married from 1992 until his death in 2007) would become an investor two years after his death.

1980s

He won the 1980 World 600 at Charlotte and the Los Angeles Times 500 (the final major motor race held at Ontario Motor Speedway) and finished 3rd in points.

In 1981 he started racing in the No. 15 Bud Moore Ford Thunderbird. He had wins at Nashville Speedway USA, the final race at Texas World Speedway, and Richmond. In addition, he received his final top-ten points finish, finishing tenth that year.

Parsons raced in about half of the races between 1983 and 1986 for owner Johnny Hayes. Parsons' final career victory came in 1984 at the Coca-Cola 500 at Atlanta.

He appeared in the 1983 Burt Reynolds movie Stroker Ace.

Parsons joined Hendrick Motorsports in 1987 as a substitute driver for Tim Richmond, who was stricken with AIDS and would succumb in 1989. During the first lap of a race at Darlington Raceway, Parsons hit the wall and badly damaged his race car. He was able to continue, but had to make several pit stops for repairs. At one point, his crew chief, Harry Hyde refused to allow Parsons to pit because he and the crew were on an ice cream break. This incident was alluded to in the film, Days of Thunder. Another scene in the film was inspired by a real-life incident at Martinsville Speedway involving Parsons and the notoriously cantankerous Hyde: Hyde sarcastically told Parsons to hit the pace car on a restart because it was the only thing on the track Parsons had not hit.

Parsons drove the No. 90 Bulls Eye BBQ Ford for Junie Donlavey in his final NASCAR season in 1988 and then moved to the broadcast booth, a position that he would hold until his death.

Parsons did decide to race a few other times, the first during the 2003 Old Dominion 500 as part of Wally's World segment and he drove a ceremonial victory lap at the last fall race at Rockingham in 2003 in a 1973 Chevrolet similar to the one he won the championship with.

He is also credited with discovering former NASCAR driver Greg Biffle at a "Gong Show" held in Tucson, Arizona.

Awards and statistics
Inducted into the NASCAR Hall of Fame in 2016 as part of the Class of 2017.
Inducted into the International Motorsports Hall of Fame in 1994.
Named as one of the NASCAR's 50 Greatest Drivers in 1998.
Inducted into the Court of Legends at Charlotte Motor Speedway in 1994.
Inducted into the Motorsports Hall of Fame of America in 2005.
Had 283 top 10 finishes, led at least one lap in 192 races, and finished no lower than fifth in points between 1972 and 1980.

Motorsports career results

NASCAR
(key) (Bold – Pole position awarded by qualifying time. Italics – Pole position earned by points standings or practice time. * – Most laps led.)

Grand National Series

Winston Cup Series

Daytona 500

International Race of Champions
(key) (Bold – Pole position. * – Most laps led.)

NASCAR announcer
He began announcing as a pit reporter in the 1980s on ESPN and TBS while he was still racing part-time. After permanently retiring from racing in 1988, Parsons became a broadcaster – first on ESPN, and then with NBC and TNT in 2001. He received an ESPN Emmy in 1996, and the ACE Award in 1989. He appears in the videogames NASCAR '99, NASCAR 2000, and NASCAR 2001 as a commentator as well as an unlockable legend (he was only featured in NASCAR 2001 as an announcer). He later appeared in NASCAR Rumble as a legend in the game as well as NASCAR Thunder 2002, NASCAR Thunder 2003, and NASCAR Thunder 2004 as an unlockable driver and featured the game in NBC and TNT telecasts where Parsons did EA Sports Thunder Motion where he took viewers on a virtual ride of each track.

Parsons co-hosted coverage of Winston Cup Qualifying on North Carolina radio station WFMX with Mark Garrow in the early '90s. He continued to co-host a radio program called "Fast Talk" on Performance Racing Network (PRN) with Doug Rice until his death (he was replaced by an alternating host). He also had a podcast available on iTunes, in conjunction with CNN called "The CNN Radio Racing Report with Benny Parsons," who talks about NASCAR with CNNRadio's Michael Jones.

Parsons appeared as himself in the 1995 children's video "NASCAR For Kids - A Day At The Races,” acting as the host.

In 2005, Parsons made a cameo appearance as himself in the movie Herbie: Fully Loaded. In 2006, he again appeared as himself in Talladega Nights: The Ballad of Ricky Bobby.

Illness and death
Parsons began having trouble breathing in the summer of 2006. He was diagnosed with lung cancer. He announced later that the treatment had been successful, and that he had a clean bill of health. Parsons had stopped smoking in 1978.

His health prevented him from attending a ceremony in November 2006 where he was to be presented with the Myers Brothers Award, honoring his contributions to racing.

On December 26, 2006, Parsons was readmitted to the hospital and placed in intensive care because of complications relating to lung cancer.

On January 16, 2007, Parsons died of complications from lung cancer treatment in the intensive care unit of the Carolinas Medical Center in Charlotte, North Carolina. He is buried near his childhood home in 
Purlear, North Carolina, which is now the site of Benny Parsons' Rendezvous Ridge, which is also Terri's residence in addition to a racing museum and winery.

References

External links

Rendezvous Ridge, a Benny Parsons Vineyard (owned by his widow)
Benny Parsons at NASCAR.com
Benny Parsons at the International Motorsports Hall of Fame
"Fast Talk with Benny Parsons" radio show
"Talking with legends" USA WEEKEND, Feb. 19, 2006.

1941 births
2007 deaths
People from Wilkes County, North Carolina
Racing drivers from North Carolina
NASCAR drivers
NASCAR Cup Series champions
ARCA Menards Series drivers
International Race of Champions drivers
Motorsport announcers
Deaths from lung cancer
Deaths from cancer in North Carolina
Burials in North Carolina
International Motorsports Hall of Fame inductees
American television sports announcers
People from Ellerbe, North Carolina
NASCAR Hall of Fame inductees
Hendrick Motorsports drivers